Kenneth P. LaValle (born May 22, 1939 in Brooklyn, New York) is a former American politician. He represented District 1 in the New York State Senate. The district comprises the five East End towns of Long Island, New York, as well as the central and eastern portions of the Town of Brookhaven, New York. A Republican, LaValle was first elected in 1976. He was the longest-serving member of the Senate and has served more terms in office than any other current state senator in the United States.

Early life, education, and family
Born in Brooklyn, LaValle graduated from Hempstead High School. He received a B.S degree from Adelphi University in 1961 and an M.S. in Education from the State University of New York at New Paltz (SUNY New Paltz) in 1964. He also received a Juris Doctor from the Touro College Jacob D. Fuchsberg Law Center in 1987. LaValle is an attorney; he was admitted to the New York bar in 1993.

LaValle is the father of two grown children. He resides in Port Jefferson, New York, with his wife, Penny.

New York Senate
LaValle first ran for the New York Senate in 1976 to succeed retiring Senator Leon E. Giuffreda. He defeated Democratic nominee Barry McCoy, a physicist, winning 51% of the vote. Since then, he has faced very few serious challenges in his re-election campaigns.

In 2007, Gov. Eliot Spitzer appointed LaValle to the New York State Commission on Higher Education, which was charged with identifying ways of improving the quality of higher education in the State. LaValle also served on the National Council of State Legislatures’ Blue Ribbon Commission on Higher Education. He played a key role in the development of the School Tax Relief (STAR) program. He also authored the 1993 Pine Barrens Preservation Act.

In 2011, LaValle voted against allowing same-sex marriage in New York during roll-call for the Marriage Equality Act, which legalized same-sex marriage in the state.

The Kenneth P. LaValle Stadium at Stony Brook University bears his name.

On January 10, 2020, LaValle announced that he would not seek re-election to the Senate in 2020. He was succeeded by Anthony Palumbo, and his term ended on December 31, 2020.

References

External links
 Twitter Page: Senator LaValle
 Facebook page: Kenneth P. LaValle
 YouTube Channel: Senator LaValle

Republican Party New York (state) state senators
1939 births
Living people
Touro Law Center alumni
Adelphi University alumni
State University of New York at New Paltz alumni
People from Port Jefferson, New York
21st-century American politicians